Taxisco is a town and municipality in the Santa Rosa department of Guatemala.  It is located near the shoreline of the Pacific Ocean.

Taxisco was the birthplace of Juan José Arévalo, who served as President of the Republic from 1945 to 1951.

Prior to the Spanish Conquest, Taxisco was occupied by the Xinca people.

Notes

References

External links
Geographical database

Municipalities of the Santa Rosa Department, Guatemala
Populated places in Guatemala